"Sweet Southern Comfort" is a song written by Rodney Clawson and Brad Crisler, and recorded by American country music artist Buddy Jewell.  It was released in October 2003 as the second single from his album Buddy Jewell.  It peaked at No. 3 on the United States Hot Country Singles & Tracks in 2004, as did his previous single "Help Pour Out the Rain (Lacey's Song)" in 2003. It also peaked at No. 40 on the U.S. Billboard Hot 100.

Content
The song tells of a small town man comparing small towns in the Southern U.S. to his hometown. Although his town is never mentioned it is implied that it is also in the Southern U.S. It mentions many Southern U.S. states such as "Carolina", Mississippi, Louisiana, Alabama, Arkansas, and Georgia.

Music video
The music video was directed by Eric Welch. It was released November 8, 2003. Filmed entirely in sepia tone, it begins and ends with Jewell on the phone with presumably his wife, telling her that he misses her while on the road and can't wait to come home. As the song plays, Jewell is seen performing outside a barn, while various depictions of a simpler time in the Southern US are shown. It was filmed in San Antonio, TX (which is one of the places mentioned in the song).

Chart positions
"Sweet Southern Comfort" debuted at number 47 on the U.S. Billboard Hot Country Singles & Tracks for the week of November 1, 2003.

Year-end charts

References

2003 singles
Buddy Jewell songs
Songs about the American South
Songs written by Rodney Clawson
Songs written by Brad Crisler
Song recordings produced by Clint Black
Columbia Records singles
2003 songs